The St. Paul Saints are a professional baseball team based in Saint Paul, Minnesota.

St. Paul Saints may also refer to:

Baseball teams
St. Paul Saints (UA), a baseball team that represented St. Paul, Minnesota during 1884 in the Union Association 
St. Paul Saints (1895–1899), former name of the Chicago White Sox baseball team from 1895 to 1899
St. Paul Saints (1901–1960), a baseball team that played in the American Association from 1901 to 1960

Ice hockey teams
St. Paul Saints (AHA), amateur and professional ice hockey team from 1914–1942, originally known as the St. Paul Athletic Club
St. Paul Saints (USHL), a professional minor league ice hockey team that played from 1945 to 1951 in the United States Hockey League
St. Paul Saints (IHL), a professional minor league ice hockey team that played from 1959 to 1963 in the International Hockey League
St. Paul Fighting Saints, a professional minor league ice hockey team that played the 1992–93 season in the American Hockey Association